John S. Horgan (born 26 October 1940) is a former Labour Party politician, professor of journalism at Dublin City University and, from 2007 to 2014. the first Press Ombudsman in Ireland.

Early life and family
Horgan is the grandson of John J. Horgan, a solicitor and politician associated with both the Irish Parliamentary Party and the Irish Volunteers. The son of doctors he was brought up in County Kerry, his mother Gwen (Jane) Richards was an English born Methodist whose father was also a doctor. He graduated in 1962 from University College Dublin. Horgans Ph.D. thesis was supervised by Professor John Joseph Lee also a former senator and became the book Seán Lemass: The Enigmatic Patriot. Horgan is married to Mary Jones, their daughter Jane Horgan-Jones is a Dublin City Councilor for the Labour party
and their son Jack is a reporter with the Sunday Business Post. His son from his first marriage Conor is a filmmaker and photographer.

Political career
Horgan began his career in 1962 as a journalist on the Evening Press. He later worked as a staff journalist on the Catholic Herald and The Irish Times, where he wrote about religion and education.

In 1969 Horgan was elected as a member of the 12th Seanad Éireann, representing the National University. He was re-elected in 1973, to the 13th Seanad. At the general election in 1977 he was elected to Dáil Éireann as a TD for Dublin County South. After boundary changes for the general election of 1981 he was not re-elected in the new constituency of Dublin South and he was also unsuccessful at the general election in February 1982. He did not stand again.

After John O'Connell resigned as one of the two Labour Party Members of the European Parliament (MEPs) for Dublin Horgan was appointed to replace him on 21 October 1981. He served in the European Parliament only until March 1983, when he resigned to take up an academic post.

After politics 
Horgan was appointed in 1983 as a lecturer in what was then the National Institute for Higher Education in Dublin. In 1989 it became Dublin City University (DCU) and he was appointed Professor of Journalism, a position he held until his retirement in 2006. He was also a member of the Interim Radio Commission, the Commission on the Newspaper Industry and the Forum on Broadcasting.

Press Ombudsman
In August 2007 the newly formed Press Council of Ireland appointed Horgan as Ireland's first-ever Press Ombudsman. 
The Press Council began operations  on 11 January 2008. Its Code of Practice sets out the standards expected from newspapers and periodicals published in Ireland, and members of the public can raise complaints about articles that directly affect or involve them, and that may breach the Code. The Ombudsman's role is to mediate and, if necessary, adjudicate on cases where a complainant has not reached agreement with a publisher. More complex cases may be referred to the full Press Council.

The new system was launched partly to provide an alternatively to increasingly costly litigation and to head off the threat of a new privacy law. On 9 January 2008 the Minister for Justice, Brian Lenihan, announced that a proposed new privacy law would be postponed for two years to give the Press Ombudsman "an opportunity to establish himself and the credibility of his office".

On 28 March 2014, Horgan announced that he would step down as Press Ombudsman on 1 September 2014. Peter Feeney succeeded Horgan in the post.

Published works
Books by John Horgan include:
 "Great Irish Reportage" (editor). Dublin: Penguin Ireland. 
 Broadcasting and Public Life: RTÉ News and Current Affairs 1926–1997. Dublin: Four Courts Press, 2004. 
 Irish Media: A Critical History Since 1922, London: Routledge, 2001. 
 Noel Browne: Passionate Outsider, Dublin: Gill & Macmillan, 2000. 
 Seán Lemass: The Enigmatic Patriot, Dublin: Gill & Macmillan, 1997. 
 Mary Robinson: An Independent Voice, Dublin: O'Brien Press, 1997. 
 Labour: The Price of Power, Dublin: Gill & Macmillan, 1986. 
 Humanae Vitae and the Bishops: The Encyclical and the Statements of the National Hierarchies, Shannon: Irish University Press, 1972. 
 The Church Among the People, Ohio: Pflaum Press, 1969. OCLC 3135844
 The Last Revolution: The Destiny of Over- and Under-Developed Nations, (translator) by Louis-Joseph Lebret, Dublin: Gill & Son, 1965. OCLC 1430125

References

External links

Dublin City University – Staff Profile – Prof John Horgan

1940 births
Living people
Evening Press people
Irish non-fiction writers
Irish male non-fiction writers
Labour Party (Ireland) MEPs
Labour Party (Ireland) TDs
Members of the 12th Seanad
Members of the 21st Dáil
MEPs for the Republic of Ireland 1979–1984
The Irish Times people
Members of the 13th Seanad
Ombudsmen in the Republic of Ireland
Members of Seanad Éireann for the National University of Ireland
Labour Party (Ireland) senators
People educated at St Gerard's School, Bray
Alumni of University College Dublin
Alumni of University College Cork
Academics of Dublin City University